Amiyah Scott (born January 11, 1988) is an American actress, model, author, and dancer. She is known for her presence on social media apps such as Instagram, as a fixture in the LGBT ball community, and for her role as Cotton in the Fox television series Star (2016–2019). She also appeared in the eighth season of The Real Housewives of Atlanta.

Early life

Amiyah Scott was born in Manhattan on January 11, 1988. She was raised in New Orleans, Louisiana.

As an adolescent, she experienced bullying. At 15, Scott underwent a partial male-to-female transition, and at 17, she fully transitioned. At this time, she moved out of her parents' house and explored entrepreneurship opportunities. Since young adulthood, she has been a well-respected member of the LGBT ball community.

Career

Acting

Scott became an internet celebrity when videos of her performing as part of ballrooms were uploaded to YouTube. She then became "Insta-famous" following the posting of a before-and-after photo which contrasted her young self, styled as male, and her current self, the self-actualized female.

In 2015, it was announced that Scott had been added to the cast of The Real Housewives of Atlanta for its eighth season; she was the first transgender woman to be cast in the Real Housewives franchise. Scott later left the show, stating that she was offended by the way the producers wanted her to behave, which she believed would have been an exploitation of her trans identity. Producers on Bravo later claimed the reason Scott was not on the show anymore was because her transgender identity was "not enough to make [her] interesting."

Shortly after her departure from Housewives, Scott was cast by Lee Daniels in the show Star; this became Scott's first acting role. She starred on the series from 2016 to 2019, for three seasons.

Other ventures

Activism 

In addition to acting, Scott is a motivational speaker and activist with the goal of giving a voice to transgender women. Her presentations focus on the themes of bullying, self-esteem, and self-acceptance.  At an event in Atlanta hosted by the Gay & Lesbian Association against Defamation (GLAAD), the GLAAD President, Sarah Kate Ellis, said that "Amiyah Scott is a talented actress and brilliant advocate who uses her voice to uplift transgender women of color and educate fans everywhere about transgender people and issues. At a time when LGBTQ visibility in the South is critical to moving our community forward, we are proud to stand with women like Amiyah to promote messages of love and acceptance." In addition, Scott is also vocal with politics. For example, she criticized some of the Trump administration's policies together with other activists in the transgender community such as Laverne Cox and Janet Mock.

Books

Scott published her first book, a memoir called Memoirs of a Mermaid, on March 31, 2019.

Cosmetics

Scott has a beauty line, Amiyah Beauty, with RivalWorld. Her first product is a lip-gloss.

Awards

Filmography

Podcasts

References

External links

 https://theamiyahscott.com/

Living people
1988 births
21st-century American actresses
African-American actresses
American television actresses
Female models from New York (state)
African-American female models
Actresses from New York City
LGBT African Americans
American LGBT rights activists
Transgender rights activists
Transgender actresses
Transgender female models
Transgender writers
LGBT people from New York (state)
LGBT people from Louisiana
Actresses from New Orleans
Female models from Louisiana
African-American female dancers
Dancers from Louisiana
Dancers from New York (state)
21st-century African-American women
21st-century African-American people
20th-century African-American people
21st-century American LGBT people
American LGBT actors
20th-century African-American women